Making a Splash may refer to:
 Making a Splash, a book written by Taylor MH
 Making a Splash, a 1984 film by Peter Greenaway

See also
 Make a Splash, a child-focused water safety initiative created by the USA Swimming Foundation